Norman Richard Pace Jr. (born 1942) is an American biochemist, and is Distinguished Professor Emeritus of Molecular, Cellular and Developmental Biology at the University of Colorado.  He is principal investigator at the Pace lab.

Early life and education
Pace was born and raised in rural Indiana. When he was a high school student, Pace attended a summer science program at Indiana University in which he worked in the laboratory of microbiologist Dean Fraser.  His participation led to a co-authorship on a scientific paper.

He graduated with honors in 1964 from Indiana University with an A.B., and later from the University of Illinois in 1967 with a Ph.D. At Illinois, Pace worked under the guidance of Sol Spiegelman. After receiving his PhD in 1967, Pace remained at Illinois for the next two years as a post doctoral fellow.

Career
In 1969, Pace moved to Denver and simultaneously held teaching positions at both the National Jewish Hospital and Research Center and the University of Colorado Medical Center for three years as an Assistant Professor of Biophysics and Genetics. In 1975, Pace was promoted to Associate Professor of Biophysics and Genetics at the University of Colorado Medical Center and he dropped his affiliation with the National Jewish Hospital. In 1982, Pace was promoted to a full Professor of Biochemistry, Biophysics, and Genetics. 

In 1984, he moved to Indiana University as a Professor of Biology and was named Distinguished Professor of Biology in 1992. In 1994 he was named Distinguished Professor of Biology and Chemistry.

In 1996, Pace moved to University of California, Berkeley as a Professor of Plant and Microbial Biology, and Molecular and Cell Biology for a stay of three years before being recruited to the University of Colorado, Boulder in 1999 as a Professor of Molecular, Cellular and Developmental Biology (MCDB). He was named Distinguished Professor of MDCB in 2008. 

He was bestowed with an honorary Doctor of Science degree from Indiana University on May 4, 2018, and gave the inaugural Norman R. Pace Lecture on May 7, 2018.

He has worked with the NASA Astrobiology Institute.

Research
Pace's research involved the synthesis, structure, and function of RNA and the application of molecular biology tools to problems in environmental microbial biology.

Personal life
Pace married, divorced, and later remarried Bernadette Pace, a PhD microbiologist and a professional trapeze artist.

Awards
 1987 Lew Bicking Award
 1991 Fellow of the American Academy of Arts and Sciences
 1991 Member of the National Academy of Sciences
 2001 Selman A. Waksman Award in Microbiology of the National Academy of Sciences
 2001 MacArthur Fellows Program
 2007 Abbott-American Society for Microbiology Lifetime Achievement Award
 2008 RNA Society Lifetime Achievement Award
 2008 International Society of Microbial Ecology Tiedje Award for Lifetime Achievement
 2017 Massry Prize
 2018 Honorary Doctor of Science degree from Indiana University
 2019 Stanley Miller Medal

References

External links
Pace lab
The Atlantic - The Man Who Blew The Door Off The Microbial World

1942 births
Living people
American biochemists
Indiana University alumni
University of Illinois alumni
Indiana University faculty
University of California, Berkeley faculty
University of Colorado faculty
University of Colorado Boulder faculty
MacArthur Fellows
Fellows of the American Academy of Arts and Sciences
Members of the United States National Academy of Sciences